Pijnacker-Nootdorp is a municipality in the Randstad conurbation in the Netherlands, in the province of South Holland.

The municipality of Pijnacker-Nootdorp comprises three settlements: Delfgauw, Nootdorp and Pijnacker. It also contains seven historical hamlets (one of which is partially in Delft), which all fall under one or more of the settlements for all intents and purposes. It is the result of merging the municipalities of Pijnacker and Nootdorp in 2002, with parts being annexed by neighbouring The Hague. It is part of Greater The Hague, but it also borders Delft and Rotterdam. It is also part of the larger Rotterdam-The Hague metropolitan area.

Pijnacker and Nootdorp are connected to The Hague and Rotterdam through the Randstadrail public transport system, and Nootdorp also with a tram line.

Topography

Dutch Topographic map of the municipality of Pijnacker-Nootdorp, June 2015

Notable people 

 Maria van Oosterwijck (1630 in Nootdorp – 1693) a Dutch Golden Age painter, specializing in still lifes
 Prof. Jaap Schrieke (1884 in Pijnacker – 1976) minister during the German occupation of the Netherlands
 Jan Janssen (born 1940 in Nootdorp) a Dutch former professional cyclist and winner of the 1968 Tour de France
 Klaas de Vries (born 1943) a retired Dutch politician, lives in Pijnacker
 Theo Lalleman (1946 in Pijnacker – 2013) a Dutch writer, publisher, video-artist, and cultural entrepreneur
 Rita Verdonk (born 1955) a retired Dutch politician, lives in Nootdorp
 Nancy van der Burg (born 1992 in Delfgauw) a Dutch racing cyclist

See also
Ackerdijkse Plassen

Gallery

References

External links

Official website

 
Municipalities of South Holland
Municipalities of the Netherlands established in 2002